Vepris samburuensis is a species of plant in the family Rutaceae. It is endemic to Kenya.

References

Sources

sam
Endemic flora of Kenya
Vulnerable flora of Africa
Taxonomy articles created by Polbot